The Bangladesh national cricket team has appeared in each Cricket World Cup since their first appearance at the 1999 Cricket World Cup as an  associate team which was mainly held in England. Bangladesh's highest achievements in World Cup are reaching the Super Eight stage in the 2007 Cricket World Cup and the Quarter-Final of the 2015 Cricket World Cup.

Cricket World Cup records

Team wise record

Bangladesh at 1999 Cricket World Cup

Bangladesh for the first time participated in Cricket World Cup in this edition as an associate member and were placed in the Group B. Bangladesh played their first ever World cup match against  New Zealand at  County Ground in Chelmsford and they eventually lost the match by 6 wickets being bundled out for just mere 116 runs in first innings. They also lost their second group match against West Indies by 7 wickets. However Bangladesh tasted their first World Cup victory against another associate nation Scotland in their third group match courtesy of Minhajul Abedin's well made 68* where they defeated Scotland by 22 runs.

However Bangladesh returned to their losing circle again in their next match against Australia where Australia beat them by 7 wickets. But in their very next match they stunned the cricket world by defeating Pakistan, the Champion of 1992 Cricket World Cup by 62 runs courtesy of good batting efforts of  Akram Khan, Shahriar Hossain and a match winning bowling effort by Khaled Mahmud. This win also helped them acquiring Test status in the very next year.

After the Group stage Bangladesh finished at fifth position with 2 wins and 3 losses. Though Bangladesh could not make way to the Super Six stage but they returned to country with some moderate performances.

Squads
Coach: Gordon Greenidge

Bangladesh at 2003 Cricket World Cup

After their moderate performance in their first appearance in World Cup and acquiring Test status in 2000, Bangladesh would have expected a better World Cup performance this year but they had a nightmare performance in this tournament losing 5 out of their group matches while one was washed out and were placed last in their group.

Bangladesh were placed in Group B with Sri Lanka, Kenya, New Zealand, South Africa, West Indies and Canada. In their first group match Bangladesh was upset by Canada, first time featuring in the World Cup. Though Canada could only manage 180 losing all wickets, Bangladesh had more worse performance being bundled out for just 120 and lost the match by 60 runs. In their third match West Indies managed 244 batting first, in the second inning Bangladesh could bat only 8 overs and match washed away due to heavy rain.
In none of their group matches Bangladesh could breach the line of 200-run marks while the match against Caribbeans washed away. Their highest team total in the tournament was against New Zealand where they posted 198 losing 7 wickets but the latter successfully chased that down with 7 wickets in hand. In their last group match they could not even chase 217 runs posted by  Kenya and were folded in just 185 runs resulting in their 32-runs defeat and consequently Kenya progressed to the Super Six stage.

Squads
Coach:  Mohsin Kamal

 Akram Khan replaced Mashrafe Mortaza on 19 February 2003

Bangladesh at 2007 Cricket World Cup

16 teams (including 6 associates) participated in 2007 World Cup. For the first and only time the World Cup teams were divided into 4 groups, each group consisting 4 teams. Bangladesh were placed into Group B along with India, Sri Lanka and the first and only time participant Bermuda. This time Bangladesh squad were much more balanced with experienced guys Habibul Bashar, Abdur Razzak,  Aftab Ahmed, Javed Omar, Mashrafe Mortaza, Mohammad Ashraful,  Mohammad Rafique and youngsters like Shakib Al Hasan, Mushfiqur Rahim, Tamim Iqbal.

In their first group match, Bangladesh stunned the Cricket world by defeating India by 5 wickets with the great bowling of Mashrafe Mortaza,  Mohammad Rafique and Abdur Razzak and India were all out in just 191 runs. In reply Bangladesh reached the target with 9 balls to spare courtesy of the fifties of three youngsters Shakib Al Hasan, Mushfiqur Rahim and Tamim Iqbal.

In their next group match Bangladesh lost to Sri Lanka by 198 runs.
In their third and last match of group stage Bangladesh sealed their spot in Super Eights defeating Bermuda by 7 wickets and consequently India had to exit the tournament from group stage.

In their Super Eight stage Bangladesh again upset the cricket world defeating South Africa by 67 runs and that was their only victory out of their 7 Super Eight matches. Above all, Bangladesh enjoyed a good tournament with two great wins against India and South Africa.

Squads
Coach:  Dav Whatmore

Bangladesh at 2011 Cricket World Cup

This World Cup should have been so memorable to Bangladesh having the advantage of playing their all matches on home soil being the co-host along with India and Sri Lanka and having the much more balanced and experienced guys like Shakib Al Hasan, the skipper, Tamim Iqbal, Mushfiqur Rahim, Mahmudullah, Shahriar Nafees, Mohammad Ashraful and  Abdur Razzak, but they failed to come up with the expectations. The  opening ceremony was hosted at Bangabandhu National Stadium.

The World Cup opened with a match between co-hosts Bangladesh and India. While India batting first posted a huge total of 370 for 4 courtesy of Virender Sehwag's 175 and a century from Virat Kohli who in the process became first batsman to score a century on World Cup debut. In reply, Bangladesh started off rapidly in their chase, getting 51 runs in the first five overs; but soon,  their top order got out but and the run-rate slowed after that and they were not in the hunt, and at the end they got to 283/9 without challenging the Indian total.

In their next match against Ireland, Bangladesh were all out scoring only 205 but in reply Ireland were folded out in 178 runs courtesy of Shafiul Islam's great bowling (4 wicket for 21 runs) who also recorded the best bowling figure by a Bangladeshi bowler.

In their third group match, Bangladesh were bowled out for 58 runs, which was their lowest ODI score, and the fourth lowest score in World Cup matches. In reply, the West Indies reached the target losing one wicket with 226 balls to spare.

In the next match England could only manage 225 runs before being bowled out, Bangladesh's score, in reply, was at one point 169/8 but Mahmudullah with the tail ender Shafiul Islam made unbeaten 58 run partnership for the 8th wicket that brought victory for the team. This win also accounted as One of their Greatest Victories of World Cup history

In the next match against  Netherlands, Bangladesh reached the target of 161 runs so comfortably losing only 4 wickets with the courtesy of Imrul Kayes' fine half century and the tight bowling of Abdur Razzak in the first innings. Thus Bangladesh made record of winning all matches against the participating European teams (Ireland, England, Netherlands) in this World Cup.

In their last group match against South Africa, Bangladesh yet again suffered a drastic batting collapse being bowled out for just 78 runs and eventually lost the match by 206 runs and their hope for qualifying for Quarter-final was also ended. Though their points was same as  West Indies (6) but their negative run-rates due to having drastic losses against South Africa,  West Indies and India, fetched them the rude reality of being disqualified for Quarter-finals while England and West Indies qualified from  Quarter finals with 1 point difference and only positive net run-rates respectively.

Squads
Coach:  Jamie Siddons

Bangladesh at 2015 Cricket World Cup

Bangladesh team joined the World Cup campaign to Australasia with a balanced team of Experienced players like Mashrafe Mortaza, the skipper, Shakib Al Hasan, Mushfiqur Rahim, Mahmudullah, Tamim Iqbal, Rubel Hossain, Shafiul Islam and youngsters like Soumya Sarkar, Sabbir Rahman and Taskin Ahmed. Bangladesh were placed in  Pool A along with two host nation,
England,  Sri Lanka, and two associate nation  Afghanistan and  Scotland.

In their first group match Bangladesh pipped Afghanistan, appearing in the World Cup for the first time, comprehensively by 105 runs with the courtesy of Shakib Al Hasan and Mushfiqur Rahim's half-century and a good spell of the skipper Mortaza. In this match Shakib also became first Bangladesh batsman to achieve 4000 ODI runs. The clash between Australia and Bangladesh washed away for heavy rain and points were shared between two teams. In their third group match, Bangladeshi bowlers were clueless in front of Sri Lankan Batsman and Sri Lanka reached to the peak of runs (332/1 in 50 overs) with a blistering knock of 162* from Tillakaratne Dilshan and a well composed century from Kumar Sangakkara. In reply Bangladesh could only manage 240 runs in 47 overs before being all out with some handy contributions from middle order but no one could stand up with a big knock like their counterparts and consequently Sri Lanka won by 92 runs.

In their fourth group match, Bangladesh made history chasing 319 runs as it was their highest ODI run-chase and it was also the Second highest run-chase in Cricket World Cup history
Batting first, Scotland posted 318 runs on board in terms of 8 wickets with the courtesy of Scotland's first World Cup century scored by Kyle Coetzer (156) and some handy knocks from middle order. In reply Tamim Iqbal and Mahmudullah gave a solid start after the quick fall of Soumya Sarkar and at one point Tamim brought the hope of finishing the century-less run of Bangladesh in World Cup but he fell 5 runs short. But Bangladesh did not make any mistake later and they reached the target with 11 balls to spare with the help of 50s from Mahmudullah, Shakib Al Hasan, Mushfiqur Rahim and a 42* from Sabbir Rahman.

This match was most important for both teams as the winner of this match could be qualified for the Quarter-finals. Bangladesh batting first, lost their both openers cheaply, then Soumya Sarkar gave some resistance with Mahmudullah, but soon they were in a part of bother with the quick fall of Sarkar and Shakib Al Hasan. Mushfiqur Rahim then joined Mahmudullah in the repairing job and both did well with the fifth wicket partnership of 141 which was the highest partnership for any wicket for Bangladesh in a World Cup match. In the process, Mahmudullah (103) became first Bangladeshi batsman to score a century at the World Cup. Mushfiqur also joined the party with a quick-fire 89 and Bangladesh posted a total of 275 runs in 50 overs with the loss of 7 wickets. In reply, England started well but Moeen Ali got run out when team was on 43. From there wickets kept falling on regular intervals. Most of the players got good start while Ian Bell and Jos Buttler converted their scores into 50s. At one point they were 238/6, needing 37 runs in almost 4 overs and it was almost an easy task for them. Then Buttler and Chris Jordan got out making it 238/8, on the other hand Chris Woakes (42*) was carrying home to the cruise. When the team needed 15 runs in 12 balls Rubel Hossain came to bowl and bowled both Stuart Broad and James Anderson within a span of 3 balls and Bangladesh snatched a thrilling victory of 15 runs, securing their  berths for Quarter-finals. This was also Bangladesh's second successive win against World Cup.

Bangladesh faced India in their first-ever Knockout stage appearance in World Cup history. India, batting first, posted 302 runs in 50 overs losing 6 wickets with the help of a fine century by Rohit Sharma (137) and a sixty-odds from Suresh Raina. In reply, all of the Bangladesh's top and middle order (except Imrul Kayes) batsman got good start but neither anyone could come up with a big knock nor they got a big partnership and wickets kept on falling on regular interval. Consequently, Bangladesh could only manage 193 runs losing all wickets in 45 overs, resulting in their 109 runs loss.

The umpires received widespread criticism after some controversial decision-making, calling a low full-toss delivery a no-ball, bowled by Rubel Hossain and Rohit Sharma who was on 90* then, was caught at deep  mid-wicket.  ICC President Mustafa Kamal said that Bangladesh would appeal against the decisions of the umpires in ICC's board meeting.

Squads
Coach:  Chandika Hathurusinghe

1 On 23 February, Al-Amin Hossain was sent home from the tournament after breaking a team curfew. He was replaced by Shafiul Islam.
2 On 6 March, the injured Anamul Haque was replaced by Imrul Kayes.

Bangladesh at 2019 Cricket World Cup

International Cricket Council decided to cut out the number of teams in the World Cup with only 10 teams to be qualified. Top 8 ranked ODI teams will qualify automatically and rest of the 2 teams will be qualified from 2018 ICC World Cup Qualifier. Bangladesh qualified for the World Cup directly having been on no. 7 spot in the ICC ODI rankings on 30 September 2017. Bangladesh announced their 15-man squad on 16 April. 

Bangladesh team participated in the World Cup with a high expectations having been one of the most experienced team in the World Cup and already being the unbeaten Champion of 2019 Ireland Tri-Nation Series defeating West Indies, which was their first ever multi-team tournament win, that even just before the World Cup campaign.

Bangladesh started off their World Cup campaign with a high note defeating South Africa by 21 runs, thus becoming the first Asian team to defeat South Africa twice in World Cup. Batting first they scored 330 runs in 50 overs which was their highest ever total in ODIs. In the match Shakib Al Hasan became the quickest Al-rounder to score 5,000 runs and pick up 250 wickets in ODI.

In their second match against New Zealand Bangladesh posted an average score of 244 but they lost the thriller by 2 wickets for a few mistakes on the field.
In the third match against the host Bangladesh elected to field and England posted a huge total of 386 runs in 50 overs with a brilliant 153 run from Jason Roy, in reply Bangladesh could only manage 280 runs in 48.5 over before being bowled courtesy of Shakib Al Hasan's century but any-other batsmen could not show any intent to win the match.
Their next match with Sri Lanka washed away. In their next match against West Indies they returned strongly with their Highest successful run chase in ODIs and Second highest successful run chase in World Cup as West Indies posted 321 runs in their 50 overs losing 8 wickets. In return Bangladesh made a flying start and always kept their run-rate around 6.5. Shakib Al Hasan scored back to back century in the World Cup. Shakib with Liton Das made an unbeaten 189 run partnership for the 4th wicket that took the team to victory with 43 balls to spare while the latter scored and unbeaten 94 runs.

In the next match Australia posted a mammoth 381 runs courtesy of David Warner's blistering 166. In reply with the help of Mushfiqur Rahim's unbeaten 102 Bangladesh could manage their highest total in ODI, 333 runs in their 50 overs losing 8 wickets but that was not enough to win the match.
In the match against Afghanistan, Bangladesh managed 262 runs on a spinner-friendly wicket, in reply, Afghanistan were folded in 200 runs while Shakib Al Hasan picked up his first 5-fer in World Cup and also became only 2nd player in World Cup to score 50+ runs and picked up 5-fer in a match, alongside he also became the only player to score 1,000 runs and pick up 30 wickets in the World Cup.
In the match against India, Bangladesh lost by 28 runs managing 286 runs losing all wicket while chasing 315 runs. In the match Shakib Al Hasan became first ever cricketer to score 500+ runs and picked up 10+ wickets in a single World Cup.
In their last group match against Pakistan, Bangladesh were folded at 221 runs while chasing 316 runs and lost by 94 runs. Shakib Al Hasan (Ban) equalled Sachin Tendulkar's record of making the most 50+ scores in a single World Cup tournament (7).

Thus Bangladesh, though started with a very high expectations, they finished at number 8th position having won only 3 out of their 8 matches (1 match washed out) with one of the most experienced team in this World Cup. But Shakib Al Hasan probably had his best form in his life and he also made his position in the World Cup XI.

Squads
Coach:  Steve Rhodes

Statistics

Most runs

Most runs according to ESPN Sports Media.

Most wickets
Most wickets according to ESPN Sports Media.

References

External links

Bangladesh in international cricket
History of the Cricket World Cup
Cricket in Bangladesh